Code page 1040 (CCSID 1040), also known as Korean PC Data Extended, is a single byte character set (SBCS) used by IBM in its PC DOS operating system for Hangul. It is an extended version of the 8-bit form of the N-byte Hangul Code first specified by the 1974 edition of KS C 5601 (compare the relationship between Code page 1041 and JIS X 0201 for katakana).

Codepage layout

References

1040